Khanolkar is an Indian name. Notable people with the surname include: 

 C. T. Khanolkar (1930–1976), Marathi playwright and poet
 Savitri Khanolkar (1913–1990), professor of sociology at Geneva University
 V. R. Khanolkar (1895–1978), Indian pathologist

Indian surnames